Monte Kim Miller formed a group known as the Concerned Christians in Colorado, during the 1980s. Created to combat New Age religious movements and anti-Christian sentiment, it has shifted to more of an apocalyptic Christian movement as the group adopted the less mainstream views of the millennium held by Miller. The group has been described as a terrorist group and is now inactive. They believe all Jews should be converted to Christianity.

Beliefs and values 
The Concerned Christians believe that the collapse of the Soviet Union in 1991 signaled "the time of the end". They interpret many biblical passages regarding the apocalypse through the lens of political events in world history. It is stated that they believe that the office of the U.S. President is the seat of the Antichrist. For example, in what is titled The Seed of Abraham, the group reports that Abraham Lincoln, the 16th President of the United States, was the archetypal Antichrist and helped build the "Babylonian nation that leads the entire world astray". They see American patriotism as a "foolish" compromise to their Christian beliefs. Founder, Monte "Kim" Miller proclaimed that he was "the Prophet of the Lord", and that God spoke through his mouth.

Arrest and deportation by Israeli authorities 
Between 60 and 80 members of the group disappeared from their homes and jobs in Colorado in October 1998 and were the subject of a search. On January 3, 1999, they gained notoriety when they were arrested and deported from Israel as part of an Israeli effort to protect the Al-Aqsa mosque from extremist Christian groups, codenamed "Operation Walk on Water". According to Israeli police, the Concerned Christians were one of several independent groups who believed it must be destroyed to facilitate the return of Jesus Christ. The group members said that they were law-abiding religious pilgrims there to await the return of Jesus but had no plans to participate in any illegal activity.

The group is said to currently reside in Greece or the Philadelphia, Pennsylvania area and its potential threat level has since been disputed.

References

External links
Official Website

Apocalyptic groups
Christian new religious movements
Christian organizations established in the 1980s
1980s establishments in Colorado